In communications or computer systems, a configuration of a system refers to the arrangement of each of its functional units, according to their nature, number and chief characteristics. Often, configuration pertains to the choice of hardware, software, firmware, and documentation. Along with its architecture, the configuration of a computer system affects both its function and performance

See also 
Auto-configuration
Configuration management - In multiple disciplines, a practice for managing change
Software configuration management
Configuration file - In software, a data resource used for program initialization
Configure script (computing)
Configurator
Settings (Windows)

References
 Federal Standard 1037C

External links 
 Elektra Initiative for Linux configurations